Domini Blythe (August 28, 1947 – December 15, 2010) was a British-born Canadian actress. Her numerous stage, film and television credits included Search for Tomorrow, External Affairs, The Wars, Savage Messiah, Montreal Stories and Mount Royal.

Early life and education 
Blythe was born in Upton-by-Chester. She graduated from the Central School of Speech and Drama in London.

Career 
She worked for the Royal Shakespeare Company and made her stage debut in London's West End in 1970 in Oh, Calcutta! She appeared as Anna Müller in the Hammer film Vampire Circus in 1972 before moving to Canada the same year, eventually settling in Stratford, Ontario. She went on to perform in many leading roles at the Stratford Festival and the Shaw Festival in Niagara-on-the-Lake.

Personal life 
Some sources identified film writer-director Jean Beaudin as her husband. The Independent reported that he was "her partner of more than 20 years". Blythe died of cancer in Montreal on December 15, 2010, at the age of 63.

Filmography

Film

Television

References

External links

1947 births
2010 deaths
Actresses from Montreal
Actresses from Ontario
Canadian stage actresses
Canadian film actresses
Canadian television actresses
Deaths from cancer in Quebec
English stage actresses
English emigrants to Canada
Alumni of the Royal Central School of Speech and Drama
People from Stratford, Ontario
Royal Shakespeare Company members
Canadian Shakespearean actresses